The Irminio is a  long river located in south-eastern Sicily, southern Italy. It is the most important of the rivers of the province of Ragusa.

Its main affluences are the streams Cava Volpe, Ciaramite, Mastratto, and near Ragusa Ibla the streams San Leonardo and Santa Domenica.

Natural reserves

Dam
The 10 November 1976 works started to build a dam along the river in the area between Ragusa and Giarratana.

References

European drainage basins of the Mediterranean Sea
Rivers of Italy
Rivers of Sicily
Rivers of the Province of Ragusa